Viktor Viktorovich Sobolev (September 2, 1915 – January 7, 1999) was a Soviet and Russian astrophysicist, Academician of the Russian Academy of Sciences, Academician of the Academy of Sciences of the USSR (since 1981), Hero of Socialist Labour (1985).

Biography 
He was born in Petrograd, and studied at the Leningrad State University from 1933 to 1938, and in 1948, he received the title of Professor. He was elected a corresponding member of the Academy of Sciences of the USSR in 1958.

References

Sources 
  (in Russian)
  (in Russian)

1915 births
1999 deaths
Soviet  astronomers
Heroes of Socialist Labour
Soviet scientists
Soviet professors
Full Members of the Russian Academy of Sciences